Namibia, despite its scant population, is home to a wide diversity of languages, from multiple language families: Germanic, Bantu, and the various Khoisan families. When Namibia was administered by South Africa, Afrikaans, German, and English enjoyed an equal status as official languages. Upon Namibian independence in 1990, English was enshrined as the nation's sole official language in the constitution of Namibia. German and Afrikaans were stigmatised as relics of the colonial past, while the rising of Mandela's Youth League and the 1951 Defiance Campaign spread English among the masses as the language of the campaign against apartheid.

Language demographics

The most widely spoken languages used in households are Oshiwambo dialects, by 49% of the population; Khoekhoegowab by 11%; Afrikaans by 10%; RuKwangali by 9%; and Otjiherero by 9%. Other native languages include the Bantu languages Setswana, Gciriku, Fwe, Kuhane, Mbukushu, Yeyi; and the Khoisan Naro, ǃXóõ, Kung-Ekoka, ǂKxʼauǁʼein and Kxoe. English, the official language, is spoken by 3% of people as their native language. Portuguese was spoken by 4–5% of the total population, i.e. 100,000 people, made up mostly of the Angolan community in 2014. The number of Angolans in Namibia declined from 2014 to 2015, affected by the neighbouring country's economic crisis. Among the white population, 60% speak Afrikaans, 32% German, 7% English, and 1% Portuguese.

Indigenous languages are included in the school syllabus at primary level.  From secondary level English is the medium of instruction. English is the main lingua franca in the north and Afrikaans in the south. English and Afrikaans are both widely spoken in Windhoek.

Languages most often spoken in Namibian households

Source: 2001 Census and 2011 Census

See also
 Namibian Sign Language
 German language in Namibia

References